The Castle of Ouguela is a medieval castle erected in the civil parish of São João Baptista, municipality of Campo Maior, in the Portuguese district of Portalegre.

It is classified by IGESPAR as a Site of Public Interest.

Built on an escarpment, the castle dominates the village on the left bank of Abrilongo riverside, near its confluence with the Xévora river. Rebuilt by King Dinis (1279-1325), the castle received bulwark walls during the reign of King John IV (1640-1656). Its walls resembled the Spanish fortification of Alburquerque. It currently is a member of the Tourism-Promotion Plains Area.

History

Early history 
The early occupation of its site dates back to pre-Roman fort.
At the time of the Roman invasion and occupation of the Iberian Peninsula, the town was designated under the name Budua. During its occupation by the Visigoths, they called it Niguela. From the eighth century Umuyyad Muslims had the town fortified.

Medieval castle 
At the time of the Reconquista of the Iberian Peninsula, reconquest of the village and its surrounding land was finally achieved 1230, by Castilian and Leonese forces. Years later, May 28, 1255, the good-men of Badajoz county donated Ouguela and elsewhere to the Bishop of Badajoz.

By the Treaty of Alcañices on 12 September, 1297, the domains of Ouguela and its castle transferred to the Crown of Portugal. The following year, King Dinis (1279-1325) in Lisbon on January 5, 1298, aimed at increasing Ouguela's settlement and defense, granted the town a charter with many privileges, with a focus on its defense.

During the reign of Ferdinand starts the construction of the new fence of the village, works that continue under the reign of King John I (1385-1433). The latter, also with a view to its settlement and defense, granted the village the Couto privilege homiziados (7 December 1420).

War of Independence to modern day 

During the War for the Restoration of Portuguese independence, the advisers to John IV (1640-1656) determined that there was a need to modernize their defenses, which won bulwark lines project in charge of the French architect Nicolau de Langres.

It is from this period that the episode immortalized his defense when the Alentejo invasion by a force of 1,500 riders and 1,000 infants Spaniards coming from Badajoz under the Marquis command Torrecusa in 1644. For the achievement of Ouguela offered one traitor, João Rodrigues de Oliveira, who worked with the Spanish. 

During the eighteenth century, records indicate a construction started to build a bulwark, a half-bastion and a ravelin after the earthquake of 1755. With the defense thus strengthened, the garrison under the command of cavalry captain Brás de Carvalho repelled the Spanish invasion of 1762. 

Legal papers dating from the period between 1755 and 1803 shows the defenses consisted of a watchman, ditches and cuttings. On that date, were built under the Marquis of command de la Reine, the Sergeant Major of Engineers Maximiano Jose Serra, the scopes of Cabeço da Forca and Martyr. Although there have been designed to recover one of the towers south of the castle (1828) and the construction of a crescent to the east Access Protection (1829), the square was demilitarized in 1840. Subsequently, the West sector, defined by bulwark structures, it became a cemetery of the village.
  
The property was classified as Property of Public Interest by decree published on August 18, 1943.

The forces of nature taking its toll brought government attention. The government intervened through the National Buildings and Monuments Directorate General (DGEMN) and oversaw development campaigns in 1976, 1987, 1991 and 1994 that involved the consolidation, repairs and restoration of ramparts and the internal areas and access to the castle.

Recently developed a draft protection and enhancement of the castle and fortifications Ouguela, designed by the architects Miguel Pedroso de Lima and Jose Filipe Cardoso, integrating the recovery, revitalization and enhancement of the urban centers of Ouguela (Portugal) and Albuquerque (Spain) and their fortifications. The project envisages the creation of a museum area, core research and documentation, and implementation of circuits (equestrian and pedestrian) with scenic connection Albuquerque fortification.

References 

Ouguela
Ouguela